Attichy is a commune in the Oise department in northern France. The current village has a bakery, a library with a detailed history during the First and Second World War, a hospital for the elderly, a pizzeria and a town hall with limited tourist information. During the Second World War, the Americans established a Prisoner of War camp at Attichy (Chelles)

Nearby towns: Compiègne, Beauvais, Reims.
Closest villages: Couloisy, Jaulzy, Bitry, Berneuil-sur-Aisne, Croutoy, Saint-Pierre-lès-Bitry, Trosly-Breuil.

Population

See also
 Communes of the Oise department

References

Communes of Oise